George Wilson VC (29 April 1886 – 22 April 1926) was a Scottish recipient of the Victoria Cross, the highest and most prestigious award for gallantry in the face of the enemy that can be awarded to British and Commonwealth forces.

Details
Wilson was 28 years old, and a private in the 2nd Battalion, The Highland Light Infantry, British Army during the First World War, during the First Battle of the Aisne, when the following deed took place for which he was awarded the VC.

The medal
Wilson's Victoria Cross is displayed at the Museum of The Royal Highland Fusiliers, Glasgow, Scotland. He died of tuberculosis at Craigleith Hospital and is buried in Piershill Cemetery in Edinburgh.

References

 Profile
Monuments to Courage (David Harvey, 1999)
The Register of the Victoria Cross (This England, 1997)
Scotland's Forgotten Valour (Graham Ross, 1995)
VCs of the First World War - 1914 (Gerald Gliddon, 1994)

External links
Location of grave and VC medal (Edinburgh)

1886 births
1926 deaths
20th-century deaths from tuberculosis
Military personnel from Edinburgh
British World War I recipients of the Victoria Cross
Highland Light Infantry soldiers
British Army personnel of World War I
Tuberculosis deaths in Scotland
British Army recipients of the Victoria Cross